This is a list of episodes from the MTV show Bully Beatdown.

Season 1

Unaired Pilot
A producer stated that the original pilot for the show, which included a female co-host, never aired.

Ryan: The Family Favorite
First aired: 22 March 2009

The victim for the series premier is named Alan, a man who gets bullied by his bigger younger brother. In his tape, Alan explains that Ryan gets away with bullying him because he is the family favorite. He also states that in the past Ryan pushed him down a flight of stairs and put his head through a wall. Another victim named Nick appears in the tape and accuses Ryan of humiliating him and giving him a scar on the forehead by pushing him down some bleachers. Ryan accepts Mayhem's challenge to fight an MMA fighter. Mayhem brings Ryan to his gym and decides to let Ryan punch him in the head (which he describes as annoying but not painful). After watching Ryan in the gym he decides to put Ryan up against Tony 'The Gun' Bonello. Ryan was tapped out three times in the first round; first for a rear naked choke, and then twice more for two consecutive guillotine chokes. In the second round, he was KO'd after a kick in the gut. After the fight Alan and Ryan hug and Ryan apologizes which Alan seems to accept.

Bully: Ryan
Height: 6' (note: see weight below)
Weight: 200 lbs. (height and weight not officially given. listed height and weight are claimed by brother in his video, but are likely estimations.)
Fighter: Tony 'The Gun' Bonello
Height: 6'2"
Weight: 200 lbs.
Victim(s): Alan (bully's older brother). Another victim named Nick appeared in a testimonial in Alan's video, but doesn't actually take part in the episode.
Money earned by Bully: $2,000
Money earned by victim(s): $8,000
Original airing: Sunday, 22 March 2009

Vince: The Roommate from Hell
First aired: 29 March 2009

Mayhem shows a tape of Josh and Adam, who are bullied by Josh's current and Adam's former roommate Vince, a basketball player. According to Adam, Vince doesn't pay rent, once threw him out of his own house, and broke his door. Vince accepts the challenge to fight, after initially hesitating. In addition to the money, Mayhem adds the additional stipulation that if Vince loses, he has to move out. He shows up to train at Mayhem's gym, during which he falls down after kicking Mayhem's bag, which causes Mayhem to laugh. He shows up to the fight and learns that his opponent will be former NFL wide receiver Michael Westbrook. During the first round, Vince tapped out four times in the first round, and was KO'd in the second round. He apologizes to Adam and Josh after the fight, but says in an interview afterwards that he will not be paying them the back rent, as the $9,000 they have just won will cover it. Adam notes that he will need a new roommate since Vince will be moving out, and asks Josh if he would like to move in with him, which Josh accepts.

Bully: Vince Carosso
Height: 6'7"
Weight: 236 lbs.
Fighter: Michael Westbrook
Height: 6'3"
Weight: 223 lbs.
Victim(s): Josh and Adam (bully's current and former roommate respectively)
Money earned by Bully: $1,000
Money earned by victim(s): $9,000
Original airing: Sunday, 29 March 2010

Christian: The Angry Couch Potato
First aired 5 April 2009

Mayhem helps out Cameron and Brian, by dropping Conor "Hurricane" Heun in the cage with Christian, a lazy, couch potato with a thirst for the pain of others.

Bully: Christian
Height:
Weight:
Fighter: Conor "Hurricane" Heun
Height: 5'10
Weight: 155 lbs
Victim(s): Brian and Cameron
Money earned by Bully: $0
Money earned by victim(s): $10,000($5,000 each.)
Original airing:

Jonathan: The Rollerblade Bully
First aired 12 April 2009

Mayhem Miller helps Sergio and Thomas with Jonathan, a self-proclaimed "aggressive in-line skater," who thinks he has the right to pick on weaker people in the neighborhood, by putting him in the ring with MMA champion Jake Shields to teach him a lesson he won't soon forget.

Bully: Jonathan
Height:
Weight: 175 lbs
Fighter: Jake Shields
Height: 5'11
Weight: 170 lbs
Victim(s): Sergio and Thomas
Money earned by Bully: $2000
Money earned by victim(s): $8000
Original airing: 12 April 2009

Eriq: The Bum Rapper
First aired 19 April 2009

Mayhem Miller helps Eriq's ex-girlfriend Linda, by putting him in the ring with MMA champion Jon "Man of Faith" Murphy. She is the first female victim to appear on Bully Beatdown. Eriq taps out five times in the first round and quits very shortly into the second round, claiming his shoulder popped out. The on-site doctor found no such injury, and Linda states that Eriq frequently uses a shoulder injury claim when he fears losing a fight. The information Mayhem provided from the doctor and the statement from Linda leave the audience knowing the high likelihood that Eriq 'punked out' with a fake injury. She won $10,000.

Bully: Eriq
Height: 
Weight: 
Fighter: Jon Murphy
Height: 6'3"
Weight: 248 lb
Victim(s): Linda (bully's ex-girlfriend)
Money earned by Bully: $0
Money earned by victim(s): $10,000
Original airing:

Dennis: The Neighborhood Menace
First aired 26 April 2009

Mayhem finds Stan and Andrey and puts local bully, Dennis, an Uzbek, in the ring with Thomas "Wildman" Denny to teach him a lesson. In the first round, Dennis survived by holding onto Thomas to prevent a submission. In the second round, Thomas  laid out a barrage of punches to the midsection, but Dennis was not knocked out. Final results? All $10,000 going to the bully. Despite winning all the money, Dennis decided to stop bullying his victims Stan and Andrey. This is the first and only bully to win all of the money.

Bully: Dennis
Height:
Weight:
Fighter: Thomas Denny
Height: 5'10
Weight: 170 lbs
Victim(s): Stan and Andrey
Money earned by Bully: $10,000
Money earned by victim(s): $0
Original airing:

Garret: The King of Tustin
First aired: Online

Robert and Kyle have one major problem: Garrett. This self-proclaimed King of Tustin makes their lives miserable. The Queen of Tustin is crowned, courtesy of MMA Middleweight Jake Shields.

Bully: Garrett
Height:
Weight:
Fighter: Jake Shields
Height:  5'10
Weight:  170 lbs
Victim(s): Kyle & Robert
Money earned by Bully: $0
Money earned by victim(s): $10,000
Original airing: This episode was an online exclusive and was not aired on MTV in regular chronology with other episodes. It first aired on MTV2.

James: The Boss's Son
First aired: Online

James bullies fellow co-worker Sean. The only problem is that James is the boss's son. Ben Lagman submits James three times in the first round, but James survives the second round, despite taking quite a beating. This was Ben Lagman's first and, so far, only appearance in the series. The episode did not air in regular chronology and is not available on the Bully Beatdown website like most other episodes. It has been leaked on to the internet and it is unknown why the episode was not aired in the regular time slot. This episode has aired, late nights on MTV2.

Bully: James
Height:
Weight: 200 lbs.
Fighter: "Bad News" Ben Lagman
Height: 6'2
Weight: 193 lbs.
Victim(s): Sean (bully's co-worker)
Money earned by Bully: $7,000
Money earned by victim(s): $3,000
Original airing: This episode was not aired on MTV in regular chronology with other episodes; it first aired on MTV2.

Season 2

Brandon: The Line
First aired 27 August 2009

Former high school bully, Brandon, thinks he defines the line between the weak and the strong. He thought it would be funny to pick Alex up by the ankles, and "throw him like 15 feet across the gym." Brandon broke Sean's arm, and Sean must deal with it every day. That is, until Mayhem Miller brings in MMA champion Eddie Alvarez to teach him a lesson... Bully Beatdown-style. Brandon, the tool, ends up apologizing to them both straight up in the end. Alex and Sean won $10,000. Brandon later did porn under the name Robby Vega.

Bully: Brandon
Victim(s): Sean & Alex.
Fighter: Eddie Alvarez
Money earned by Bully: $0
Money earned by victim(s): $10,000
Original airing: 27 August 2009

Jason: The Pretty-Boy Bully
First aired 3 September 2009

Jason gets in the ring with MMA fighter Jon Murphy. Out of the $5,000 Dollars he could have won in the first round, Jason walked away with $2,000 dollars, and in the kick boxing round lost and the Victims got the $5,000 Dollars. After giving Jason a wedgie, Mayhem refers to the bully beatdown as 'God's Work'.

Victims- Step Brother, and friend from High school

Bully: Jason
Victim(s): Josh & Brett
Fighter: Jon Murphy
Money earned by Bully: $2,000
Money earned by victim(s): $8,000($4,000 each)
Original airing:

Randall: The Lyrical MC Bully
First aired: 10 September 2009

Bully Randall thinks he's a rapper, likes to call himself Bac-Dizzle and makes life a living hell for Jefferson. Until Mayhem Miller unleashes MMA super-star Jake Shields on him, to show Randall what it's really like to get picked on. Randall stands as one of just three bullies to last the 2nd round, and has won the 3rd highest amount with $5,000 dollars.

Bully: Randall
Victim(s): Jefferson
Fighter: Jake Shields
Money earned by Bully: $5,000
Money earned by victim(s): $5,000
Original airing:

Nathan: The Big Nasty Bully
First aired: 17 September 2009

Victims Martin and Adesh have a big problem with big bully Nathan. He's made their lives miserable and have the physical and emotional scars to prove it. Mayhem calls upon legendary MMA fighter, Andrei Arlovski to clean this bully's clock. He was knocked out and submitted five times. Nathan's taunting of Arlovski only makes his beating worse. Martin and Adesh won $10,000

Bully: Nathan(Big Nasty)
Height: 6'4
Weight 285 lbs.
Victim(s): Martin and Adesh
Fighter: Andrei Arlovski
Height: 6'4
Weight 242 lbs.
Money earned by Bully: $0
Money earned by victim(s): $10,000
Original airing:

Wes: The Meat-Stick Bully
First aired: 24 September 2009

Victim Chris has a problem with a tobacco spittin', hockey playing Texan and self-proclaimed "meat-stick", Wes. Mayhem enlists Tony Bonello to put this bully in his place. He was submitted 4 times and knocked out, but with an illegal head kick. Wes actually managed to knock down Tony Bonello which, apparently, upset the MMA fighter enough for him to break the rules. The kick to the head was hard enough that Wes could not remember where he was, or any of the fight. Because of the illegal kick, the bully received the $5,000 for that round. However, Wes refused it, stating "A knockout's a knockout," and then apologized to Chris by giving the money to him. Mayhem refers to Chris as his favorite victim because he is cute and adorable.

Bully: Wes
Victim(s): Chris
Fighter: Tony Bonello
Money earned by Bully: $6,000 (but turned down $5,000 from the 2nd round; left with $1,000).
Money earned by victim(s): $4,000 (but the Bully let him keep the $5,000 from Round 2, left with $9,000).
Original airing:

Colt: The Nebraska Bad Ass
First aired: 1 October 2009

DJ Timmy recruits Mayhem Miller to solve his bully problem... Colt, a tough-talking redneck from Nebraska. Mayhem gives Colt the heavyweight and light heavyweight champion of the King of the Cage, Tony Lopez. Colt tapped out four times in the first round, and got knocked out in the second, so Timmy received $9,000.

Bully: Colt Nelms
Height: 6'0
Weight: 212 lb
Victim(s): Timmy(DJ)
Fighter: Tony Lopez
Height: 6'4
Weight: 205 lb
Money earned by Bully: $1,000
Money earned by victim(s): $9,000
Original airing:

Garrett: The Psycho Nut-job
First aired: 8 October 2009

Mayhem Miller brings in NFL-player turned Pro MMA fighter Michael Westbrook to help victims Nicholas and Eric. How will Westbrook handle Garrett, the craziest bully ever? Garrett tapped out twice in the first round and was knocked out in the second round, so Nicholas and Eric won $7,000.

Bully: Garrett
Height: 6'0
Weight: 199 lb
Victim(s): Nicholas and Eric
Fighter: Michael Westbrook
Height: 6'3 
Weight: 212 lb
Money earned by Bully: $3,000
Money earned by victim(s): $7,000
Original airing:

Emil: The Beefy Barbarian Bully
First aired: 15 October 2009

Emil is a self-proclaimed Assyrian bully who was brought to the show by his victims, Anthony and Mo. Mo's girlfriend is friends with the bully and she feels bad because he has made their lives miserable with his bullying. Emil was pitted against emerging MMA fighter Nick Gaston, who forced him to tap out five times in one minute, thirty six seconds. He withdrew from the second round, the only contestant having done so to this point. Anthony and Mo won $10,000 and an apology from Emil.

Bully: Emil Mansoor
Height: 5'9
Weight: 245 lb
Victim(s): Anthony and Mo
Fighter: Nick Gaston
Height: 6'4
Weight: 265 lb
Money earned by Bully: $0
Money earned by victim(s): $10,000 ($5,000 each)
Original airing:

Unaired episodes

Marquez: The Wannabe B-Boy
Meet Marquez, a street fighter who makes life miserable for twins Richard and Edward. Mayhem brings in Brazilian jiu-jitsu specialist, Quinn Mulhern standing at 6'3 and weighing in at 177 lbs, with a record of 14 wins and 1 loss to put him in his place. This episode has never aired on American TV and is not available on the Bully Beatdown website like most other episodes. The episode has been aired in the Netherlands, the Fox8 channel of Foxtel and Austar in Australia, and MTV Latin America. Many have speculated that the bully winning more money is the reason why it was never broadcast in America.

Bully: Marquez
Height: 5'9
Weight: 167 lb
Victim(s): Richard and Edward
Fighter: Quinn Mulhern
Height: 6'3
Weight: 177 lb
Money earned by Bully: $6,000
Money earned by victim(s): $4,000
Original airing: This episode has never aired in the United States.

Harley
Ricky Legere fights a bully named Harley, to defend a French kid. The bully only taps out one time in the first round, and stands through the second one, leaving the bully with $9000.
Bully: Harley
Height: 5'8"
Weight: 80kg
Victim(s): Lewis
Fighter: Rick Legere
Height: 5'8
Weight: 85 kg
Money earned by Bully: $9,000
Money earned by victim(s): $1,000

Season 3

Andy: Get The Poison Out
First aired: 4 November 2010

Meet Andy, the self-appointed king of Fresno. He is an obnoxious bully who makes life miserable for his victims, Steven and Taylor. He also makes the biggest mistake of calling out Mayhem, so Mayhem brings out "the greatest fighter he has ever known" to take care of Andy. That fighter turns out to be Mayhem himself. After easily being tapped out 5 times in the first round and knocked out in the second round, Steven and Taylor won $10,000. After the fight, Mayhem tells a humbled Andy that he had to deal with bullies most of his life and implores him to change his ways because he eventually will come across someone that is bigger, badder and meaner than Andy himself.

Bully: Andy
Height: 6'2
Weight: 199 lbs
Victim(s): Steven and Taylor
Fighter: Jason "Mayhem" Miller
Height: 6'1
Weight: 198 lbs
Money earned by Bully: $0
Money earned by victim(s): $10,000
Original airing:

Michael: All American D-Bag
Michael, who calls himself an all-American badass, picked on William because of his culture and hobbies. It is unknown why this episode has never aired in America. However, it has aired on the Fox8 channel of Foxtel and Austar in Australia. It has never been leaked on the internet, and is not available on the Bully Beatdown website. A preview can be seen at the end of Andy's episode.  Michael tapped out five times in the first round and was knocked out with a stomach blow in the second.  William won $10,000 and an apology from his bully.
Bully: Michael
Victim: William
Fighter: Daron Cruickshank
Height: 5'8"
Weight: 170 lb
Money earned by Bully: $0
Money earned by victim: $10,000
Original airing: This aired on 9/28/12.

Nick: The Truck Stops Here
First aired: 11 November 2010

Meet Nick, he is a bully who calls himself "The Truck". He's both a singer in a Death Metal band and an in-line skater who makes life miserable for his victims, Chris and Blair. Mayhem Miller brings in legendary MMA fighter, Jeremy Horn to stop the truck once and for all. Nick tapped out five times in the first round, and got knocked out in the second round with a kick to the body. Chris and Blair won $10,000 and an apology from Nick.

Bully: Nick
Height: 6'4
Weight: 197 lb
Victim(s): Chris & Blair
Fighter: Jeremy Horn
Height: 6'1
Weight: 205 lb
Money earned by Bully: $0
Money earned by victim(s): $10,000
Original airing:

Amanda: Two Girls, One Cage
First aired: 18 November 2010

Meet Amanda, Bully Beatdown's first female bully with a bad attitude. She stands at 5'7 and makes life miserable for her victim, Keiko. Keiko is the second female victim to appear on the show, the first being Linda. Amanda calls herself "the queen" so Mayhem Miller brings in female MMA fighter Michelle Waterson who's done kickboxing since she was 10 years old to teach her a lesson. In the first round, she tapped out five times. In the second round, Amanda got KO'd with a brutal punch to her stomach. Keiko won $10,000 and an apology from Amanda.

Bully: Amanda
Height: 5'7
Victim(s): Keiko
Fighter: Michelle Waterson
Height: 5'3
Money earned by Bully: $0
Money earned by victim(s): $10,000
Original airing:

Evermont: The Royal Rumble
First aired: 2 December 2010

Meet Evermont, a wannabe rapper who says he can "smell the bitch" in his victims. He calls himself "the king" and makes life miserable for Jesse and Colton. Mayhem Miller brings in professional MMA Brazilian jiu-jitsu fighter Bobby "King" Green who has a record of 14 wins and 3 losses to put Evermont in his place. In the first round, Bobby Green made him tap out five times. In the second round, Evermont got scared and didn't continue into the second round. He was the second bully to withdraw from the second round, the first being Emil. Jesse and Colton won $10,000.

Bully: Evermont King
Height: 5'6
Weight: 181 lb
Victim(s): Jesse and Colton
Fighter: Bobby "King" Green
Height: 5'10
Weight: 174 lb
Money earned by Bully: $0
Money earned by victim(s): $10,000
Original airing:

Kevin: Hair Today, Gone Tomorrow
First aired: 9 December 2010

Meet Kevin, a bully who calls himself a natural. He is a hair-obsessed greaser that makes life miserable for his victims, Anthony and Sam. Mayhem Miller recruits Amateur Wrestler and MMA fighter Tyron Woodley to beat him down. Kevin makes a bet with Mayhem that if he loses all $10,000, he has to cut his hair. In the first round, he tapped out four times and barely escapes with $1,000 with a bruised ego. In the second round, he got TKO'd. Despite technically being allowed to keep his hair, as part of Kevin's apology, he allows Mayhem to cut his hair. Anthony and Sam won $9,000.

Bully: Kevin Garcia
Height: 5'11
Weight: 175 lbs.
Victim(s): Anthony (co-worker) and Sam
Fighter: Tyron Woodley
Height: 5'9
Weight: 182 lbs.
Money earned by Bully: $1,000
Money earned by victim(s): $9,000
Original airing:

Mike: Creatine Rage
First Aired: 16 December 2010

Meet Mike, the shortest bully to appear on the show. He stands at 5'4 and is a Bronx gym rat who makes life miserable for his victims, Lorenzo and Joey. Mayhem Miller brings in MMA fighter Eddie Alvarez with a record of 22 wins and 2 losses to teach him a lesson. In the first round, Mike tapped out five times. In the second round, he got K.O'd. Mike is the first bully to get K.O.'d without getting 1 punch thrown at him. Lorenzo and Joey won $10,000.

Bully: Mike
Height: 5'4
Weight: 160 lbs
Victim(s): Lorenzo and Joey
Fighter: Eddie Alvarez
Height: 5'9
Weight: 169 lbs
Money earned by Bully: $0
Money earned by victim(s): $10,000
Original airing:

Jordan: Bring Out The Boar
First Aired: 23 December 2010

Meet Jordan, a loud mouthed bully who calls himself the boar. He makes life miserable for twins, Austin & Micah, since one of them is going to nursing school. His real name is Jordan Rush. The bad part of it is that he's a cop's son, so he says he's "At the Top of the Food Chain". So Mayhem brings in MMA Fighter Joe Riggs with a record of 34 wins and 12 losses, to teach Jordan a lesson. In the first round, he tapped out five times. During the second round, Joe finished Jordan off via TKO. Austin and Micah won $10,000. After the fight, a humbled Jordan apologized for his behavior.

Bully: Jordan
Height: 5'9
Weight: 195 lb
Victim(s): Austin and Micah
Fighter: Joe Riggs
Height: 5'11
Weight: 202 lb
Money earned by Bully: $0
Money earned by victim(s): $10,000
Original airing:

Brett Hazard: A Bully finds Religion

Meet Brett Hazard, a loud mouthed bully who picks on Zack because of his religion and even nominated him for Prom Queen. This episode did not air on American TV during the season's initial run on MTV but eventually aired on MTV2 on October 4, 2012. However, it has aired on the Fox8 channel of Foxtel and Austar in Australia. This episode is not available on the Bully Beatdown website or iTunes, and has not been leaked to the internet. A few clips of it can be seen at the end of the previous episode (Jordan: Bring Out The Boar). At the end of that episode, a preview for this episode was shown.

Bully: Brett
Height: 5'8
Weight: 164 lb
Victim(s): Zack
Fighter: Abel Cullum
Height: 5'7
Weight: 158 lb
Money earned by Bully: $1000
Money earned by victim(s): $9000
Original airing: Friday October 4, 2012.

Brooklyn Bully

The Supertrailer for Season 3 showed an episode with a Bully proclaiming that there was "nothing tougher than a Brooklyn Bully" fighting Nick Gaston. The Bully tapped out twice due to "nothing" among his 5 taps and was TKOed 1:04 into the kickboxing round.

Bully: Tayfun Dasdemir
Height: 5'11
Weight: 341 lb
Victim(s): Chuckie, Yunas
Fighter: Nick Gaston
Height: 6'5
Weight: 266 lb
Money earned by Bully: $0
Money earned by victim(s): $10,000
Original airing: This episode was aired on MTV Canada on March 7, 2011. This episode aired on September 28, 2012 on MTV 2.

David: Tears Of A Clown

David (self-nicknamed 'The Beast') is an angry, bartending bully that spends his time picking on performance artists Keith and Alex.  To help them with their bully, Mayhem Miller brings in an undefeated MMA fighter.  This episode has aired on Fox8 on Foxtel in Australia.

Bully: David
Height: 5'11
Weight: 184 lb
Victim(s): Keith and Alex
Fighter: Sam Oropeza
Height: 6'2
Weight: 183 lb
Money earned by Bully: $0
Money earned by victim(s): $10,000
Original airing: This episode aired on September 28, 2012 on MTV 2.

Tyler
Tyler considers himself "an ambassador of awesomeness", and is really proud of his beer belly and high school wrestling experience. He bullies Joe and Dylan, with whom he shares his high school dorm, and seems to relish on peeing on things such as his dormmates' door and bed. Miller then decides to match him up with two-time Olympic wrestler Daniel Cormier, who held a perfect MMA record.
Bully: Tyler
Height: 6'1"
Weight: 250 lbs
Victim(s): Joe and Dylan
Fighter: Daniel Cormier
Height: 5'11"
Weight: 247 lbs
Money earned by Bully: $0
Money earned by victim(s): $10,000
Original airing: This episode aired on MTV2 on September 29, 2012. In MTV Latin America, this is run as the first episode of season 3, followed by the "Michael" episode, thus omitting the episode where Mayhem fights Andy.

References

Bully Beatdown